Pontremoli is a small city in the north of Tuscany in Italy.

Pontremoli may also refer to:

People
Aldo Pontremoli, Italian physicist
Esdra Pontremoli, Italian poet, editor, rabbi.
Benjamin Pontremoli, Turkish poet and rabbi
Raphael Chiyya Pontremoli, Turkish poet and rabbi
Hiyya Pontremoli, Turkish poet and rabbi
Roberto Pontremoli, Italian insurer and entrepreneur